William Lucas-Shadwell (14 August 1852 – 31 May 1915) was a Conservative Party politician in England.

He unsuccessfully contested the Finsbury East constituency at the 1892 general election, but at the 1895 general election he was elected as Member of Parliament (MP) for Hastings. He did not contest the 1900 general election.

References

External links 
 

1852 births
1915 deaths
Conservative Party (UK) MPs for English constituencies
UK MPs 1895–1900